is a junction railway station in the city of Kiryū, Gunma, Japan, jointly operated by the East Japan Railway Company (JR East) and the third-sector railway operating company Watarase Keikoku Railway.

Lines

Station layout
Kiryū Station has two elevated island platforms, with the station building underneath. The station has a Midori no Madoguchi ticket office.

Platforms

History
Kiryū Station opened on 15 November 1888. The station building was rebuilt in 1928. Upon the privatization of the Japanese National Railways (JNR) on 1 April 1987, it came under the control of JR East.

Passenger statistics
In fiscal 2019, the station was used by an average of 7519 passengers daily (boarding passengers only).

Surrounding area
 Kiryū City Hall
 Kiryū Post Office
 Kiryū City Library
 Kiryū Public Hall

See also
 List of railway stations in Japan

References

External links

 Station information (JR East) 
 Station information (Watarase Keikoku) 

Railway stations in Gunma Prefecture
Railway stations in Japan opened in 1888
Stations of East Japan Railway Company
Ryōmō Line
Kiryū, Gunma